Arai En 305-il Kadavul is a 2008 Tamil-language fantasy comedy film directed by Chimbu Deven, who earlier directed Imsai Arasan 23rd Pulikecei, starring Vadivelu. A remake of the 2003 Hollywood film Bruce Almighty, the film stars Prakash Raj, Santhanam alongside Ganja Karuppu, Jyothirmayi, and Madhumitha. An ensemble supporting cast including Sampath Raj, Madhan Bob, Rajesh, M. S. Bhaskar, Periyar Dasan, and Ilavarasu appears in supporting roles.

The movie is produced by Shankar's S Pictures. The music of the film was composed by Vidyasagar with cinematography by Soundarrajan and editing by Sasi Kumar.

The storyline of the film was that the whole universe is a computer simulation controlled by a supercomputer and God is the one who has access to it. Upon the film's release on 18 April 2008, it received mixed reviews, along  Santhanam's acting was praised by the critics. The film has also been dubbed in Telugu with the titie Gadi No.305 Lo Devudu.

Plot
Raasu (Santhanam) and Mokkai (Ganja Karuppu) are youngsters sharing a hostel with a diverse group of people. Those people include Professor Mani (Madhan Bob), a staunch atheist named Thanjai Rudran (Rajesh), a poet, and other unemployed, struggling men. Raasu, who works in a coffee shop, is in love with Mahishasuramardhini (Madhumitha), but she seemingly ignores all his advances. Raasu was even attacked by her brother after hanging around her house for extended periods of time. Mokkai, who is unemployed due to his lack of education and does whatever job that he can find, dreams of marrying his uncle's daughter (cousin) back in his village.

After a particularly bad day where Mokkai is arrested and beaten by female police officers and Raasu's lies of being in a well-paid job are uncovered (to Mahishasuramardhini's disgust), the two are also kicked out of the hostel by the owner due to the inability to pay rent. On their last night, both vent their frustration at Kadavul (God) after heavy drinking. Both are shocked when Kadavul (Prakash Raj) appears in front of them. Mistaking Him for another unemployed fellow, the two head back to their hostel room only to find Him waiting for them in it, waving aside this miracle, all three fall asleep. The next morning, Kadavul finally manages to convince Raasu and Mokkai of His true identity after appearing in the forms of Vishnu, Jesus, and Buddha.

Armed with a "galaxy box" (access to a supercomputer) that is the source of His power, Kadavul makes a deal with Raasu and Mokkai. He will spend time with the two (under the name of Arnold and the identity of both Raasu and Mokkai's uncle), observing their day-to-day routines while advising them in the process, to see whether it is truly His fault for their poor standard of living, or their own. Arnold also manages to persuade the hostel owner to extend Raasu and Mokkai's stay for a week, while their bet is undertaken.

During the allotted time, both Raasu and Mokkai learn a great deal through Arnold's own actions and His teachings. In the meantime, Wellesley Prabhu (Ilavarasu), another hostel inhabitant, accidentally discovers "Arnold's" true identity, but is persuaded to keep silent. However, Arnold is in for a shock when on His last night with them, Raasu and Mokkai steal His "galaxy box" and use it to improve their lives. To Prabhu's despair, the true God is forced to lead an ordinary (yet underprivileged) life in the hostel. Raasu and Mokkai meanwhile find that their families, despite their gifts, remain highly suspicious of their wealth and ungrateful as well. They then start to use the box to inflict suffering on their past employers and those who refused to give them jobs. Ultimately, Raasu is once again rejected by Mahishasuramardhini, who turns out to be a prostitute, and throws the box into a bin in shock. Prabhu later recovers the box and hands it back over to Arnold. Although forgiven, Raasu and Mokkai feel deep regret for their actions and promise to turn their lives around, which they duly do. Both of them become successful people in later life, along with Prabhu and various other characters.

A few years later, Arnold once again comes to the same room, to help another group of youngsters staying there and lamenting their current situation. This time, Arnold keeps His "galaxy box" bound in chains in His pocket to make sure that it is not stolen or misused like before. Arnold smiles at the camera as the film ends.

Cast

 Prakash Raj as Arnold / Kadavul (God)
 Santhanam as Raasu Krishnamoorthy
 Ganja Karuppu as Mokkaiswamy
 Madhumitha as Mahishasuramardhini
 Jyothirmayi as Bhuvana
 Sampath Raj as Raana Singh
 Madhan Bob as Professor Mani
 Rajesh as Thanjai Rudhran
 M. S. Bhaskar as Kutti Madaswamy 
 Periyar Dasan as Mokkai's father
 Ilavarasu as Wellesley Prabhu
 Cochin Hanifa as Giri Chettan
 Delhi Ganesh as Krishnamoorthy (Rassu Father)
 Thalaivasal Vijay as Engineer Rafeeq
 Naren as Coffee Day Owner
 Kuyili as Rukmani
 Chaams as "Java" Sundaresan
 Ramdoss as Raana's henchman
 Manobala as Vengi Raja
 Nellai Siva as Tea shop owner
 Kadhal Sukumar as Shanmugam
 Sashikumar Subramani as Oviyar Sodali
 V. S. Raghavan as Old Man (cameo appearance)
 Ponnambalam as a comic thief

Soundtrack

The music of the movie has been composed by Vidyasagar.

Production
The film was shot in 82 days. A dedicated team visited nearly 800 bachelor mansions around Chennai before shortlisting on the one for the final shoot. Apart from Chennai, the crew also shot in Ambasamutharam, Achan Kovil in Kerala.

Reception
The film received mixed reviews from critics; Rediff wrote "Yes, it's chock-full of comedy. But it makes you think, as well. A must-watch". Sify stated that it "is too melodramatic, mushy and slow, needs urgent trimming. Let us hope that Chimbudevan gets a better script where he will play to his strengths, next time around." Behindwoods wrote "Simbudevan seems to have begun making an attempt to classify the movie - either into a children’s movie or a full-length all-class comedy entertainer- and then given up in the end, leaving his comedy with an identity crisis."

References

External links
 

2008 films
2000s Tamil-language films
Unemployment in fiction
Indian religious comedy films
Indian fantasy comedy films
2000s fantasy comedy films
Films scored by Vidyasagar
Fiction about God
Films directed by Chimbu Deven
2008 comedy films
Indian remakes of American films